Tyler Ott (born February 28, 1992) is an American football long snapper for the Seattle Seahawks of the National Football League (NFL). He played high school football at Jenks High School in Jenks, Oklahoma, and college football at Harvard University in Cambridge, Massachusetts. He was originally signed by the New England Patriots as an undrafted free agent in 2014.

Early years
Tyler Ott was born in Tulsa, Oklahoma, on February 28, 1992, to Dan and Laurie (now Applekamp) Ott. He attended grade school in the Jenks Public School system, and would go on to attend Jenks High School.

While attending Jenks High School, Ott was a three-year letter winner in football, basketball and track and field. During his high school career, he was a three-year captain in football, and a senior captain in basketball and track and field. He threw shot put and discus in track and field, and ended his career with personal records of 50 feet 2 inches in shot put and 148 feet 9 inches in discus. He would play in three football state championships, winning one in 2007 defeating Tulsa Union High School 42-24.

He played tight end and long snapper for Jenks High School, and finished his high school football career with 47 catches, 771 total receiving yards, and 7 receiving touchdowns.

College career
Ott played college football at Harvard University, was the team's tight end and long snapper all four years. Though he spent his first year at Harvard as a blocking tight end, he would emerge as the team's primary long snapper his sophomore year, and made his first catch as a tight end against Columbia in his junior season. In his senior season, he became one of the two starting tight ends in Harvard's two tight end offense. Following his senior season, Tyler was invited to play in the Senior Bowl after finishing the year with 15 receptions, 188 yards and four touchdowns. On October 28, 2013, he was named National Tight End of the Week by College performance awards, after catching three touchdowns in Harvard's triple overtime loss to Princeton. His three touchdowns against Princeton tied Harvard's record for single game touchdown receptions.

He graduated from Harvard in 2014 with a Bachelors of Arts degree in Economics and a minor in Environmental Science & Public Policy. While at Harvard, he lived in Dunster House with house masters Roger B. Porter and Ann Porter.

Professional career

New England Patriots
The New England Patriots signed Ott as an undrafted free agent on May 16, 2014. He was released by the Patriots on August 17, 2014. The Patriots re-signed Ott on March 4, 2015. Ott was released by the team on May 5, 2015.

St. Louis Rams
On May 12, 2015, Ott signed with the St. Louis Rams after a minicamp tryout. He was released on September 1, 2015.

New York Giants 
On December 31, 2015, the New York Giants signed Ott to the active roster, after long snappers Zak DeOssie and Danny Aiken suffered season-ending injuries. Ott became the first Harvard Crimson football player to play for the Giants. On August 30, 2016, he was waived by the Giants. He was re-signed to the practice squad on October 19, 2016. He was released by the Giants on October 25, 2016.

Cincinnati Bengals
On November 22, 2016, Ott was signed to the Bengals practice squad. He was promoted to the active roster on November 26, 2016. He was released on December 20, 2016.

Seattle Seahawks
On January 3, 2017, Ott signed with the Seattle Seahawks to take the place of the injured Nolan Frese.

On August 1, 2019, Ott signed a new four-year contract with the Seahawks.

On December 21, 2020, Ott was named as the starting long snapper for the NFC in the 2021 Pro Bowl.

On September 14, 2022, Ott was placed on injured reserve.

References

External links
Harvard Crimson bio

1992 births
Living people
American football long snappers
Harvard Crimson football players
New England Patriots players
St. Louis Rams players
New York Giants players
Cincinnati Bengals players
Seattle Seahawks players
Players of American football from Oklahoma
Sportspeople from Tulsa, Oklahoma
National Conference Pro Bowl players